Kang Soo-il (born 15 July 1987) is a South Korean professional footballer, who is currently playing as a forward for Ansan Greeners.

He was awarded the MVP in the 2008 season of Reserve League.

Career 
Born to a Korean mother and an African American G.I. father, Kang dropped out of University to join Incheon United in 2007 in order to earn money to support his family after his mother suffered a back injury. he moved to Jeju United in 2011 and spent the 2014 season on loan at Pohang Steelers.

Eligible to play for both South Korea and United States, Kang opted to represent his country of birth. Called up to make his international debut for South Korea against UAE in June 2015, hours before the kick-off he was forced to withdraw after failing a doping test. He blamed his testing positive for anabolic steroid methyltestosterone on his use of moustache-growing cream. He did not contest the charge and accepted an automatic 15-game ban from the K-League.

Club career statistics

References

External links 
 

 
 

1987 births
Living people
South Korean footballers
Incheon United FC players
Jeju United FC players
Pohang Steelers players
K League 1 players
Sangji University alumni
South Korean people of African-American descent
Seoul Kang clan
Association football forwards